The International Forum of Sovereign Wealth Funds (IFSWF) is a nonprofit international group of sovereign wealth funds managers which was established in 2009. It is based in London, England.

History

In 2009, a group of 23 leading state-owned international investors from around the world established the IFSWF's precursor, the International Working Group of Sovereign Wealth Funds, following discussions with global groups such as the G20, IMF, and the U.S. Department of Treasury in 2007 and 2008. The Working Group created a set of Generally Accepted Principles and Practices, better known as the "Santiago Principles", for sovereign wealth funds' institutional governance and risk-management frameworks. Following the Kuwait Declaration in 2009, the International Working Group became the IFSWF with the mandate of helping members implement the Principles.

Overview 

As of February 2018 IFSWF had 32 members, including some of the world's largest sovereign wealth funds, like the China Investment Corporation, Kuwait Investment Authority, and the Abu Dhabi Investment Authority. It was set up by the funds, so they could come together and create an organisation to promote best practice within their field. Its focus is "to exchange views on issues of common interest and to facilitate an understanding of sovereign wealth funds' activities and of the Santiago Principles".

The 24 Santiago Principles are a voluntary standard of best practice principles and practices endorsed by the IFSWF members for the management of the Sovereign Wealth Funds. Its member funds collectively have about $5.5 trillion under management, representing 80% of assets managed by sovereign funds globally.

When established the IFSWF formalized a limited number of partnerships with world-leading financial and academic partners. The inaugural meeting of IFSWF was held in Baku, Azerbaijan, and it was hosted by the State Oil Fund of Azerbaijan and the government of Azerbaijan. In 2016, the IFSWF and Standards Board for Alternative Investments establish a mutual observer relationship to share knowledge and experience with the objective to raise Standards in the financial industry.

Looking at the most recently published accounts at Companies House, IFSWF Limited made a net profit of £176,758 GBP as of December 31, 2015. This included a nonrefundable capital transfer from the IMF in relation to accumulated membership fees of £884,194 GBP. The accounts are generated in accordance with the International Financial Reporting Standards.

See also
International standard
Standards organization

References

Financial regulation
International organisations based in London
Sovereign wealth funds
Standards organisations in the United Kingdom